Emamzamen may refer to:

Emamzamen, Kohgiluyeh and Boyer-Ahmad